Kai Lukas Havertz (born 11 June 1999) is a German professional footballer who plays as an attacking midfielder or forward for  club Chelsea and the Germany national team.

Having graduated from Bayer Leverkusen's youth academy in 2016, Havertz made his senior debut with the club at the same year. Upon making his debut, Havertz became the club's youngest-ever debutant in the Bundesliga, and he became their youngest-ever goalscorer when he scored his first goal the following year. He is also the youngest player to reach the milestones of 50 and 100 league appearances in the German top flight.

Havertz's performances sparked the interest of several European clubs, with Chelsea signing him in 2020 for a transfer worth €84 million (£72 million), making him Chelsea's second-most expensive signing until Romelu Lukaku's signing in 2021. With Chelsea, Havertz won the 2020–21 UEFA Champions League, 2021 UEFA Super Cup, and the 2021 FIFA Club World Cup, scoring the winning goals in the Champions League final and FIFA Club World Cup, while assisting teammate Hakim Ziyech's goal in the UEFA Super Cup.

After appearing for Germany at various youth levels, Havertz made his senior international debut in September 2018, becoming the first player born in 1999 to represent the national team. He represented Germany at UEFA Euro 2020 and the 2022 FIFA World Cup.

Early life
Havertz was born in Aachen, North Rhine-Westphalia. He grew up in Mariadorf, a district of Alsdorf. Later, the family moved to Aachen. His father is a policeman and his mother is a lawyer.

Club career

Youth career
Havertz received his first experience in football at the age of four when he joined amateur club Alemannia Mariadorf, where his grandfather, Richard, was chairman of the club. In 2009, he was signed by 2. Bundesliga club Alemannia Aachen where he spent only a year in the club's academy before joining Bayer Leverkusen at the age of 11. In the years that followed, he had to overcome the challenges associated with growth spurts and in 2016, after scoring 18 goals for the club's U-17 team, he was awarded the silver U-17 Fritz Walter Medal before breaking into Leverkusen's senior team the following year.

Bayer Leverkusen

Havertz made his debut for Bayer Leverkusen on 15 October 2016, coming on as a second-half substitute for Charles Aránguiz in a 2–1 Bundesliga loss to Werder Bremen. Upon entering the field of play, he became the club's youngest-ever Bundesliga debutant, at the age of 17 years and 126 days, although his record was broken (by 111 days) by Florian Wirtz in 2020. On 17 February 2017, he assisted teammate Karim Bellarabi to score the 50,000th Bundesliga goal. Four days later, following the suspension of teammate Hakan Çalhanoğlu, he was handed his first Champions League start in the first leg of a round of 16 loss to Atlético Madrid. He was ruled out of the return leg of the fixture in March, however, as the match clashed with the examinations period at his school. He scored his first goal for the club on 2 April, netting a late equaliser in a 3–3 draw with VfL Wolfsburg. Upon doing so, Havertz broke another club record to become Leverkusen's youngest-ever goalscorer in the Bundesliga, at the age of 17. He ultimately made 28 appearances across all competitions and scored four goals, including a brace against Hertha BSC on the final day of the season, as Leverkusen ended the campaign in 12th position.

On 14 April 2018, Havertz became the youngest player in the history of the Bundesliga to reach 50 appearances at 18 years and 307 days old, breaking the record previously held by Timo Werner. He went on to end his second full campaign with the club with 30 league appearances and three goals to his name as Leverkusen ended the season in fifth place.

Havertz continued to impress during the following season, despite Leverkusen initially struggling in the league, and by the mid-way point of the campaign was the only player to have started every match for the club, scoring six goals along the way. On 20 September 2018, Havertz scored his first two goals in European competitions in a 3–2 win against Ludogorets Razgrad in the 2018–19 UEFA Europa League. On 26 January 2019, he became Leverkusen's youngest-ever penalty scorer when he scored from the spot in a 3–0 league win over Wolfsburg, aged 19 years, seven months and 16 days. The following month, he became the second youngest-ever player to achieve 75 Bundesliga appearances, behind Julian Draxler, when he started and scored in a 2–0 win over Fortuna Düsseldorf. On 13 April, he scored on his 100th appearance for Leverkusen to help the club to a 1–0 league win over Stuttgart. The goal, his 13th for the campaign, also saw him become the youngest player since Stuttgart's own Horst Köppel in 1967–68 to score 13 goals in a single league season. On 5 May, he scored his 15th goal of the campaign during a 6–1 win over Eintracht Frankfurt; a match which for the first time ever saw seven goals scored in the first half of a Bundesliga match. On the final day of the season, he became the highest scoring teenager in a single Bundesliga campaign when he scored his 17th goal during a 5–1 win over Hertha BSC. At the end of the season, he was named runner-up to Marco Reus for the German Footballer of the Year award, losing out by just 37 votes.

On the opening day of the 2019–20 campaign, Havertz scored in Leverkusen's 3–2 win over Paderborn, becoming the second-youngest player of all time behind Köppel to score 25 Bundesliga goals. In December, at the age of 20 years, six months and four days, he broke another of Werner's records to become the youngest-ever player to reach 100 Bundesliga appearances when he started in his team's 2–0 defeat to Köln. In the 2019–20 UEFA Europa League, Havertz scored in both matches against Porto in the round of 32, then he scored a goal in a 2–1 defeat to Inter Milan in the quarter-final.

Chelsea

2020–21 season
On 4 September 2020, Havertz signed a five-year contract with Premier League club Chelsea. The transfer fee was reported to be worth an initial £62 million, which could rise to £71 million with add-ons, making him Chelsea's second-most expensive signing after Kepa Arrizabalaga. On 14 September, he made his Chelsea debut in the league opener against Brighton & Hove Albion, which ended in a 3–1 away win. On 23 September, Havertz scored his first career hat-trick and his first Chelsea goals in a 6–0 home win over Barnsley in the third round of the EFL Cup. Havertz scored his first-ever Premier League goal against Southampton on 17 October, in a 3–3 draw at home. On 4 November 2020, it was revealed that Havertz had tested positive for COVID-19.

On 29 May 2021, he scored the only goal of the game in the 2021 UEFA Champions League final. It was his first-ever goal in the UEFA Champions League as Chelsea beat fellow English club Manchester City to win the competition for the second time in club history.

2021–22 season
On 11 August 2021, Havertz won the UEFA Super Cup with Chelsea, beating Villarreal in the final on penalties, despite him missing his penalty. On 28 August, he scored his first goal of the season in a 1–1 draw at Liverpool.

On 12 February 2022, Havertz scored the winning goal in the 117th minute of the FIFA Club World Cup Final from a penalty kick, which ended in a 2–1 victory over Palmeiras.

2022–23 season
On 3 September 2022, Havertz scored the winner in a 2–1 home victory against West Ham United for his first goal of the season. On 25 October, he scored the winner in a 2–1 away victory against Red Bull Salzburg, which qualified his club for the knockout phase.

International career

Youth
Havertz made his debut for the Germany national under-16 team on 11 November 2014, starting in the friendly match against the Czech Republic before being substituted out in the 57th minute for Tom Baack. The match finished as a 3–1 win for Germany.

Havertz was included in Germany's squad for the 2016 UEFA European Under-17 Championship in Azerbaijan. He appeared in all five of Germany's matches, scoring once before Germany were eliminated by Spain in the semi-final.

Following a 15-month absence from youth internationals, Havertz made his debut for Germany's under-19 team, debuting on 31 August 2017 in the 0–0 friendly draw against Switzerland, coming on in the 72nd minute for Palkó Dárdai. On 4 October 2017, in his third appearance for the under-19 team, Havertz scored four goals in a 5–1 win against Belarus in the first round of European Under-19 Championship qualifying. He was later named captain of the under-19 team.

Senior

On 29 August 2018, Havertz was called up to Germany's senior team for the first time by head coach Joachim Löw. He was included in the squad for Germany's UEFA Nations League match against France and friendly against Peru. Havertz made his international debut on 9 September 2018, coming on as a substitute in the 88th minute for Timo Werner against Peru, with the match finishing as a 2–1 home win for Germany. Upon making his debut, he became the first player born in 1999 to represent the national team. On 19 May 2021, he was selected to the German squad for the UEFA Euro 2020. On 19 June 2021, he scored Germany's third goal in the 51st minute in a 4–2 win over Portugal in the UEFA Euro 2020. He scored a goal in the final group fixture for a 2–2 draw against Hungary which saw his side qualify for the knockout phase of the competition.

In November 2022, he was selected in the final squad for the 2022 FIFA World Cup in Qatar. On 1 December, he scored a brace in a 4–2 win over Costa Rica; however, Germany did not progress to the knockout round.

Player profile

Style of play
Havertz has been described as a technically gifted, two-footed attacking midfielder who is comfortable with the ball on either foot and adept with his head. During his formative years, his style of play drew early comparisons to compatriot Mesut Özil, with Havertz himself admitting the midfielder was a player he looked up to. By the age of 19, and following numerous impressive performances in the Bundesliga, further comparisons had been drawn between Havertz and former Leverkusen players such as Michael Ballack and Toni Kroos and some began describing him as a combination of all three and an Alleskönner – a player who can do everything. He has also been compared with Thomas Müller, as they both have the talent for finding spaces in congested areas and making the right runs, although Havertz has been described as a more elegant and skilful player than Müller. Havertz prefers the false nine role, which he played at Chelsea. However, during the 2021–22 season, he had no specific position and was experimented in different positions, though his best streak came when he played centrally as a forward/false nine, roles that he is very familiar with.

Reception
Due to his finesse and technique, Paul Merson called Havertz a Rolls-Royce footballer stating, "Havertz is one of Chelsea's best players. People forget he is class. He knits things together. He's a Rolls-Royce, he glides round the pitch."

Personal life
Havertz has been in a relationship with German model and social influencer Sophia Weber since 2018.

Career statistics

Club

International

Germany score listed first, score column indicates score after each Havertz goal

Honours
Bayer Leverkusen
DFB-Pokal runner-up: 2019–20

Chelsea
UEFA Champions League: 2020–21
UEFA Super Cup: 2021
FIFA Club World Cup: 2021
FA Cup runner-up: 2020–21, 2021–22
EFL Cup runner-up: 2021–22

Individual
UEFA European Under-17 Championship Team of the Tournament: 2016
Fritz Walter Medal U17 Silver: 2016
Fritz Walter Medal U19 Gold: 2018
Bundesliga Team of the Season: 2018–19
kicker Bundesliga Team of the Season: 2018–19
Bundesliga Player of the Month: April 2019, May 2019, May 2020
UEFA Champions League Breakthrough XI: 2019
UEFA Europa League Squad of the Season: 2019–20

References

External links

Profile at the Chelsea F.C. website

1999 births
Living people
Sportspeople from Aachen
Footballers from North Rhine-Westphalia
German people of Dutch descent 
German footballers
Association football midfielders
Bayer 04 Leverkusen players
Chelsea F.C. players
Bundesliga players
Premier League players
FA Cup Final players
UEFA Champions League winning players
Germany youth international footballers
Germany international footballers
UEFA Euro 2020 players
2022 FIFA World Cup players
German expatriate footballers
Expatriate footballers in England
German expatriate sportspeople in England